Rally of Lebanon (known originally as the Rally Montagne) is the only tarmac rally of the Middle East Rally Championship, organised by the ATCL (Automobile et Touring Club du Liban). The rally was first held in 1968.

Past winners

Driver Multiple wins

Make Multiple wins

External links
 Rally Of Lebanon – official website
 ATCL – ATCL website
ATCL Facebook page

Rally competitions in Lebanon
Motorsport competitions in Lebanon
Lebanon
Recurring sporting events established in 1968